Klang Valley is an urban conglomeration in Malaysia that is centered in the federal territories of Kuala Lumpur and Putrajaya, and includes its adjoining cities and towns in the state of Selangor. It is conterminous with Greater Kuala Lumpur, although there are variations between the two.

The Klang Valley is geographically delineated by the Titiwangsa Mountains to the north and east and the Strait of Malacca to the west.  It extends to Rawang in the northwest, Semenyih in the southeast, and Klang and Port Klang in the southwest. The conurbation is the heartland of Malaysia's industry and commerce. As of 2022, the Klang Valley is home to roughly 9 million people.

Origin
The valley is named after the Klang River, the principal river that flows through it that starts at Klang Gates Quartz Ridge in Gombak and flows into the Straits of Malacca in Port Klang, The river is closely linked to the early development of the area as a cluster of tin mining towns in the late 19th century. Development of the region took place largely in the East-West direction (between Gombak and Port Klang) but the urban areas surrounding Kuala Lumpur have since grown north and south towards the border with Perak and Negeri Sembilan respectively.

Regions
There is no official designation of the boundaries that make up the Klang Valley but it is often assumed to comprise the following areas and their corresponding local authorities:

Federal Territory of Putrajaya
 Putrajaya Corporation
Federal Territory of Kuala Lumpur
Kuala Lumpur City Hall
 Selangor district of Petaling
Shah Alam City Council
Petaling Jaya City Council
Subang Jaya City Council
Selangor district of Klang
Klang Municipal Council
Selangor district of Gombak
Selayang Municipal Council
Selangor district of Hulu Langat
Ampang Jaya Municipal Council
Kajang Municipal Council
Selangor district of Sepang
Sepang Municipal Council
Selangor district of Kuala Langat
Kuala Langat Municipal Council

Transport

Even though the Klang Valley officially consists of separate cities and suburbs, integration between these cities is very high, with a highly developed road network and an expanding integrated rail transit system. Many expressways criss-cross the metropolis making cars the most convenient way to get around. However, this has led to the Klang Valley's notorious traffic jams which span whole kilometres of expressways and make driving during peak hours exhausting. Since the 1990s, new rail systems, such as Rapid KL's light rapid transit (LRT), mass rapid transit (MRT), KTM Komuter, ERL's airport rail links and a monorail have been developed. Most of these systems have gone through extensive expansion as a superproject. The Klang Valley Integrated Transit System, as of now, is currently being upgraded to include a new MRT line and LRT line, as well as a monorail serving Putrajaya. Buses that operate around Klang Valley are also extensive.

See also
 1998 Klang Valley water crisis
 Greater Kuala Lumpur
 Kuala Lumpur
 List of metropolitan areas in Asia by population
 Public Transport in Klang Valley

References

 
Klang River
Valleys of Malaysia
K
Landforms of Selangor
Peninsular Malaysia